Mark Carruthers OBE (born 1965) is a Northern Irish journalist. He currently presents a number of television and radio programmes for BBC Northern Ireland.

Broadcasting work 
Carruthers first joined BBC Northern Ireland in 1989 contributing to Good Morning Ulster and PM Ulster on BBC Radio Ulster.

In addition to having presented BBC Newsline, he has also presented Spotlight and Let's Talk for television and Evening Extra on BBC Radio Ulster.

In August 2009, Carruthers became part of the presenting team of Good Morning Ulster as part of a series of presenter changes at BBC Radio Ulster.

He is now the presenter of The View and Sunday Politics on BBC One Northern Ireland. 
He also presents the weekly politics podcast Red Lines on BBC Sounds.

He has been nominated for four Royal Television Society awards for his work – in 2022, 2020, 2018 and 2003. In 2005 he and his BBC Newsline co-presenter, Donna Traynor, lifted a prestigious IFTA (Irish Film and Television Award) for Best News Programme.

Personal life
Carruthers was born in Londonderry, grew up in Limavady, County Londonderry, studied at Coleraine Academical Institution and went on to study for degrees in Political Science and Irish Politics at Queen's University Belfast.

Carruthers has an interest in the theatre. He was one of the founders of Tinderbox Theatre Company in 1988  and took part in drama groups at college and university, including a stage appearance in a Riverside Theatre, Coleraine, production of Oliver! alongside James Nesbitt. He was Chairman of the Lyric Theatre Board until 2015 and was at the forefront of the campaign to rebuild the theatre on its south Belfast site for almost ten years.

He was appointed an OBE for services to drama in Northern Ireland in the 2011 New Year Honours list.

He is co-editor of Stepping Stones - The Arts in Ulster 1971-2001 which was published by Blackstaff Press in 2001. In 2013  Alternative Ulsters – Conversations on Identity was published by Liberties Press, a series of interviews by Carruthers with leading writers, actors, journalists and politicians.  The book was a success and was re-issued in paperback in December 2014. The following year Alternative Ulsters was shortlisted for the prestigious Christopher Ewart-Biggs Memorial Prize.

In July 2019 Carruthers was awarded an honorary doctorate (Doctor of Literature) from Queen's University Belfast for distinction in broadcasting.
 
He is married with three children and lives in south Belfast.

References

External links
 BBCi: BBC Newsline - Meet The Team: Mark Carruthers' profile

1965 births
Alumni of Queen's University Belfast
BBC newsreaders and journalists
Living people
People educated at Coleraine Academical Institution
Mass media people from Derry (city)
Radio personalities from Northern Ireland
Television presenters from Northern Ireland
Officers of the Order of the British Empire
British social commentators